Thomas Quinton Stow (7 July 1801 – 19 July 1862), generally referred to as the Rev. T. Q. Stow, but also as Quinton Stow, was an Australian pioneer Congregational minister.

Early life
Stow was born at Hadleigh, Suffolk, England, and began preaching at 17 years of age; he later studied for the Congregational ministry at the missionary college, Gosport under David Bogue. From 1822-25 Stow was minister at Framlingham, Suffolk; later at Buntingford, Hertfordshire, then was transferred to Halstead in Essex. In 1833 Stow published the Memoirs of R. Taylor, LL.D., followed by The Scope of Piety (1836). At Framlingham Stow married Elizabeth Eppes, described as a "handsome brunette . . . the rage of London society". She was a daughter of William Eppes of Bristol and his wife Elizabeth, née Randolph, descendant of an old Virginia family.

Career in Australia
On 12 October 1836 the Colonial Missionary Society in England accepted Stow and sent him to South Australia. Stow arrived at Adelaide on the Hartley in October 1837. Stow began holding services in a marquee but shortly afterwards, partly with his own hands, built the first church in South Australia. It was constructed of pine logs thatched with reeds and stood in North Terrace. In November 1840 a more substantial church was opened in Freeman Street (now Gawler Place), and there Stow worked for many years. He also for a time taught a school at the corner of Freeman and Pirie Streets. From 1846 Stow fought in opposition to state aid for religion. Stow's health, however, declined and in 1855 he found it necessary to have an assistant, and in October 1855 the Rev. C. W. Evan arrived. In September 1856 Stow resigned his pastorate, but continued to preach and work for his church as much as his health would allow. In February 1862, hoping that a change of climate might be good for him, Stow went to Sydney to supply the pulpit in the Pitt Street Congregational church, and in March became so ill that he could not be taken back to Adelaide. Stow died at the house of John Fairfax on 19 July 1862. Stow was survived by his wife and four sons.

Legacy
Stow was an outstanding preacher in early Adelaide, he was a good speaker who incorporated humour and satire. Stow helped form the character of the growing settlement of Adelaide, which was appreciated at the time. Stow was twice given substantial pecuniary testimonials to which men of all sects contributed. The Stow Memorial Church (now Pilgrim Uniting Church) in Adelaide was named for him. Stow Hall, built 1872 at 16 Flinders Street, has been a popular venue for amateur theatre productions.

He was married in England and brought his wife Elizabeth Randolph Stow, née Eppes, (c. 1797 in Newfoundland – 8 July 1867), who survived him, and four sons with him:
 Judge Randolph Isham Stow (1828-1878).
Jefferson Pickman Stow (1830–1908), who went to the Northern Territory in 1864 and sailed in a ship's boat from Adam Bay, Northern Territory to Champion Bay, Western Australia, an account of this voyage was published as a pamphlet in 1865, Voyage of the Forlorn Hope, and Notes on Western Australia. J. P. Stow was later editor of The South Australian Advertiser and was the author of South Australia, its History Productions and Natural Resources (1883, 2nd ed. 1884), published by the South Australian government.
 Augustine Stow (1833–1903), a member of parliament for several years between 1863-1871, chief clerk in the South Australian supreme court.
 Wycliffe Stow (c. 1836–1897) was one of the two sons (with Augustine) able to be at his father's side when he died.

Notes

References

English emigrants to colonial Australia
1801 births
1862 deaths
People from Hadleigh, Suffolk
Australian Christian clergy